This is a condensed list of worldwide tropical cyclone records set by different storms and seasons.

Major records

See also 
 List of weather records
 Tornado records
List of the most intense tropical cyclones
List of wettest tropical cyclones
List of tropical cyclones
List of Atlantic hurricane records
List of Pacific hurricanes

Notes

References

External links 
 Tropical Cyclone Records from the Global Weather & Climate Extremes (World Meteorological Organization)
 Bureau of Meteorology, Australian Cyclone History
 Discussion of size extremes for tropical cyclones near Australia 
 
 
 Typhoon Ophelia Record: Had a 5000 mi traveling

Records
Tropical cyclone